The Port of Kuopio (Finnish: Kuopion satama) is an inland harbour in the city of Kuopio, Finland, on the shore of Lake Kallavesi. The passenger harbour of the port is located in the Vahtivuori district on the Maljalahti bay. The cargo harbour for the cargo ship traffic is located in the Haapaniemi district, about two kilometers southwest of the passenger harbour.

Kuopio's passenger harbour is the busiest port for passenger traffic in the Vuoksi drainage basin and the Lake Finland. There are many cruise companies and restaurants, and in addition, the harbor has market stalls. The  is held at this market square near the harbour. The passenger harbour area is one of the centers of summer tourist activities alongside Kuopio Market Square. The harbour is often filled with walkers admiring Lake Kallavesi, market traders, diners on the terrace and those going on a cruise.

See also
 Port of Lappeenranta

References

External links
Passenger Harbour - Kuopio

Ports and harbours of Finland
Water transport in Finland
Buildings and structures in North Savo
Kuopio